Rudolf Keszthelyi (born 29 March 1935) is a Hungarian gymnast. He competed in eight events at the 1960 Summer Olympics.

References

1935 births
Living people
Hungarian male artistic gymnasts
Olympic gymnasts of Hungary
Gymnasts at the 1960 Summer Olympics
Sportspeople from Pécs